= Institut Jeanne Gatineau =

French cosmetics business

Institut Jeanne Gatineau was a French cosmetics business which emphasized products for the face and body. The company maintained a technologically advanced treatment line. Institut Jeanne Gatineau was acquired by Revlon in February 1980 with the approval of the French government.

The French concern trained professionals and consumers in the techniques of beauty care and makeup. A stock market analyst described the Revlon purchase of Institut Jeanne Gatineau as a positive move in its transition from a cosmetics retailer which emphasized treatment rather than merely a seller of shaded cosmetics and fragrances.

The Institut Jeanne Gatineau salon offered half-hour French facial consultations at its Broadway location in February 1990.
